Ann Wolfe (born January 17, 1971) is an American retired professional boxer, trainer and actress. Wolfe held world titles in three different weight classes simultaneously and is regarded as one of the greatest female boxers of all time. She is a member of the International Women's Boxing Hall of Fame.

Personal life
Wolfe was born in Austin, Texas and moved to Oberlin, Louisiana where she spent most of her childhood. She moved back to Austin in 1996 with her two daughters and one son.  After being homeless and working construction, she met her original trainer 'Pops' Billingsley. She fought her amateur fights under Billingsley's tutelage and started fighting as a professional for RPM Promotions.

Amateur career
Wolfe had a record of 3-1 as an amateur boxer and fought at the 1998 U.S. National Championships. She won a decision over Tami Hendrickson of Seattle in the quarter-final by 50–39, then went on to stop Shanie Keelean of Chicago within 46 seconds of the first round. In the semifinal Wolfe lost to La'Kiea Coffen by a disqualification at 1:23 of the third round.

Professional career
Wolfe made her professional debut by beating Brenda Lee Bell by a four-round decision. Her first and only career loss came four fights later, when she was knocked out in three rounds by veteran and future world champion Valerie Mahfood.

Wolfe beat Vienna Williams by a ten-round decision to win her first world title, the IFBA Jr. Middleweight title. She beat Gina Nicholas by knockout in three to win the vacant WIBA Light Middleweight title. She then proceeded to beat Shirvelle Williams by knockout in one round on a non-title bout.

Next was the vacant IFBA world Super Middleweight title, which she picked up by knocking out Marsha Valley in six rounds. She and Valley fought again, this time with the vacant WIBC's version of the title, and Wolfe won by knockout in round ten.

Wolfe avenged her defeat against Mahfood by taking the NABA World Super Middleweight Championship from her with a ten-round decision.

Wolfe vs. Ward
On May 8, 2004 in Biloxi, Mississippi, Wolfe matched Henry Armstrong's record of three world titles at the same time in different weight classes, by gaining the IBA world Light Heavyweight championship, knocking out undefeated champion and former NCAA basketball star Vonda Ward at one minute and eight seconds of Round One. Ward had a neck concussion because she hit the canvas with her neck when she fell. She was taken to the hospital in serious condition due to damage to her neck and head. The bout was nationally televised, with television commentators called it "the best knockout punch in a women’s boxing history".

Later career
Wolfe retained her title in a rematch with Valley by a sixth-round knockout.

On July 19, 2005, Wolfe defeated Monica Nunez by a seventh-round knockout in Lula, Mississippi.

On August 20, 2005, she fought and defeated Valerie Mahfood for the second time, by a ten-round decision.

Retirement
Wolfe last fought in 2006, knocking out Cassandra Giger and decisioning Lisa Ested. She has since worked as a boxing trainer.

In 2015, Wolfe was inducted into the International Women's Boxing Hall of Fame.

Training career
Wolfe has trained many amateur and professional boxers, including her oldest daughter, Jennifer Fenn, and light-middleweight James Kirkland.

Film career
Wolfe was cast by director Patty Jenkins in the role of Amazon warrior Artemis in the 2017 film Wonder Woman.

Professional boxing record

See also
List of boxing quadruple champions
List of boxing triple champions
List of light middleweight boxing champions
List of middleweight boxing champions
List of super middleweight boxing champions
List of light heavyweight boxing champions

References

External links

Sportspeople from Austin, Texas
Boxers from Texas
African-American boxers
American women boxers
American boxing trainers
World boxing champions
World light-middleweight boxing champions
World middleweight boxing champions
World super-middleweight boxing champions
World light-heavyweight boxing champions
Light-heavyweight boxers
1971 births
Living people
LGBT boxers
21st-century African-American sportspeople
21st-century African-American women
20th-century African-American sportspeople
21st-century American LGBT people
20th-century African-American women